In the Heart of the Beast Puppet and Mask Theatre (also known as Heart of the Beast or HOBT) is a puppet company and nonprofit organization from Minneapolis, Minnesota. The company has written and performed scores of full-length puppet plays, performed throughout the US, Canada, Korea, and Haiti and toured the Mississippi River from end to end. The theatre is best known for sponsoring the annual May Day Parade and Ceremony that is seen by as many as 50,000 people each year.

History 
HOBT began in 1973 as Powderhorn Puppet Theatre, named for a neighborhood park and lake in Minneapolis. In 1975, the theatre organized their first May Day procession and event. About 50-60 people and a few puppets marched, raised a maypole in the park, and had some speeches. In the next years, the event grew and evolved into a way to celebrate community builders.

In 1979, the theatre changed its name based on a suggestion by poet and theatre member Steven Lisner. In 1987, they moved into the Avalon Theater, a former cinema originally built in 1909 as the Royal Theatre. HOBT purchased the Avalon Theater in 1990 for the building and staging of productions.

In 1999, the Weisman Art Museum at the University of Minnesota exhibited Theatre of Wonder: Twenty-five Years In the Heart of the Beast, celebrating the works and productions by the theatre.

In 2017, the theatre received $275,000 from the will of Sarah Bowman, a performer and longtime supporter of the theatre. The funds are planned to be used in upgrading the theatre building. In 2018, the organization was awarded a grant by The Jerome Foundation.

Productions 
Over the years, productions have used various styles of puppet and mask performances, including bunraku and larger-than-life puppets. These include:
 "Puppet Cabaret!" (quarterly)
 "The Minotaur or: Amelia Earhart is Alive and Traveling in the Underworld" (2018)
 "Make Believe Neighborhood", celebrating Mr. Rogers (2018)
 "La Natividad" (2016, 2014, 2012, 2008, 2007, 2006)
 "Crow Boy", based on the children's book by Taro Yashima (2016)
 "Queen" by Junauda Petrus and Erik Ehn (2016)
 "La Befana" (2010, 2001, 1995, 1991, 1989, 1988, 1984, 1983, 1982, 1981, 1979, 1974)
 "The Story of Iqbal Masih" (1997)
 "Don Quixote" (1994, 1993)
 "This Land", a tribute to Woody Guthrie (1993)
 "Beowulf" (1985)
 "The Fisherman and His Wife" (1975, 1974)

May Day Parade and Tree of Life Ceremony 

The annual parade hosted by In the Heart of the Beast Theatre draws large crowds and showcases large puppets and floats and entertainment by performers. Each year's parade/festival has a theme, ranging from Spring and environmental topics to social topics like peace and racial justice. The event also features a festival in Powderhorn Park and a Tree of Life Ceremony involving more than 300 performers.

On January 9, 2019, the theatre announced that the 2019 May Day parade would be the last one they could sponsor on their own due to high costs of organizing and running the event.

In March 2019, a short documentary entitled "Children of Spring" premiered. The documentary focuses on the children involved in the May Day parade and festival. The film premiere helped raise $15,000 for May Day.

May Day Parade gallery

See also 
 Bread and Puppet Theater
 Center for Puppetry Arts
 Horse and Bamboo Theatre
 The Puppeteers Cooperative
 Spiral Q Puppet Theater
 Superior Concept Monsters
 Thingumajig Theatre

References

Further reading 
 
 
  Also available in print.

External links 
 Official website
 The people of Powderhorn's 2018 MayDay Parade & Fest

Puppet troupes
Theatre companies in Minneapolis
Arts organizations established in 1973
1973 establishments in Minnesota
Puppetry in the United States